The 85th Landwehr Division (85. Landwehr-Division) was a unit of the Imperial German Army in World War I. The division was formed in November 1914 as the Breugel Division (Division Breugel), named after its commander, Generalleutnant Willem Hendrick Clifford Kocq von Breugel, and became the 85th Landwehr Division on September 13, 1915. The division was disbanded in 1919 during the demobilization of the German Army after World War I. The Landwehr was the third category of the German Army, after the regular Army and the reserves. Thus Landwehr divisions were generally made up of older soldiers who had passed from the reserves, and were intended primarily for occupation and security duties rather than heavy combat.

Combat chronicle

The 85th Landwehr Division served on the Eastern Front. It occupied the line by Mława from November 1914 to July 1915 and then participated in the Gorlice-Tarnów Offensive, breaking through at Przasnysz and fighting on the Narew, and then participating in follow-on fighting for the next several months. In September 1915, it was in the Lithuanian swamps. It was engaged in positional warfare in the Vishnev sector on the Berezina, Olshanka and Krevljanka Rivers from September 1915 to October 1917. It moved with the line northwards in a series of fights until the armistice on the Eastern Front. The division fought in Estonia in February/March 1918, and then served as occupation troops in Estonia and Russia until the end of World War I in November 1918. Elements of the division were being transferred to Belgium at the time of the Armistice on the Western Front, and other elements remained in Lithuania and White Russia as security forces for several months after the end of World War I, finally departing in February 1919. Allied intelligence rated the division as fourth class.

Order of battle on formation

The 85th Landwehr Division was formed as a square division. The order of battle of the division on July 7, 1915, was as follows:

169. Landwehr-Infanterie-Brigade
Landwehr-Infanterie-Regiment Nr. 61
Landwehr-Infanterie-Regiment Nr. 99
170. Landwehr-Infanterie-Brigade
Landwehr-Infanterie-Regiment Nr. 17
Landwehr-Infanterie-Regiment Nr. 21
1. mobil Ersatz-Eskadron/XVII. Armeekorps
2. mobil Ersatz-Eskadron/XVII. Armeekorps
mobil Ersatz-Eskadron/Grenadier-zu-Pferd-Regiment Freiherr von Derfflinger (Neumärkisches) Nr. 3
Feldartillerie-Regiment Nr. 85
II.Bataillon/2. Pommersches Fußartillerie-Regiment Nr. 15
1. Reserve-Kompanie/Pionier-Bataillon Nr. 26
2. Kompanie/Pionier-Bataillon Nr. 26

Late-war order of battle

The division underwent a number of organizational changes over the course of the war. It was triangularized in March 1917, losing the 170th Landwehr Infantry Brigade headquarters and the 61st Landwehr Infantry Regiment. Cavalry was reduced, artillery and signals commands were formed, and combat engineer support was expanded to a full pioneer battalion. The order of battle on January 13, 1918, was as follows:

169. Landwehr-Infanterie-Brigade
Landwehr-Infanterie-Regiment Nr. 17
Landwehr-Infanterie-Regiment Nr. 21
Landwehr-Infanterie-Regiment Nr. 99
Radfahrer-Kompanie Nr. 85
5. Eskadron/Kürassier-Regiment (Brandenburgisches) Nr. 6
Artillerie-Kommandeur 85
Feldartillerie-Regiment Nr. 275
Stab Pionier-Bataillon Nr. 485
Minenwerfer-Kompanie Nr. 385
Divisions-Nachrichten-Kommandeur 585

References
 85. Landwehr-Division (Chronik 1914/1919) - Der erste Weltkrieg
 Hermann Cron et al., Ruhmeshalle unserer alten Armee (Berlin, 1935)
 Hermann Cron, Geschichte des deutschen Heeres im Weltkriege 1914-1918 (Berlin, 1937)
 Günter Wegner, Stellenbesetzung der deutschen Heere 1825-1939. (Biblio Verlag, Osnabrück, 1993), Bd. 1
 Histories of Two Hundred and Fifty-One Divisions of the German Army which Participated in the War (1914-1918), compiled from records of Intelligence section of the General Staff, American Expeditionary Forces, at General Headquarters, Chaumont, France 1919 (1920)

Notes

Infantry divisions of Germany in World War I
Military units and formations established in 1914
Military units and formations disestablished in 1919
1914 establishments in Germany